Dennis Novikov and Julio Peralta were the defending champions but only Novikov chose to defend his title, partnering Stefan Kozlov. Novikov lost in the quarterfinals to Gonzalo Escobar and Roberto Quiroz.

Scott Lipsky and Leander Paes won the title after defeating Máximo González and Leonardo Mayer 4–6, 7–6(7–5), [10–7] in the final.

Seeds

Draw

References
 Main Draw
 Qualifying Draw

Tallahassee Tennis Challenger - Doubles
2017 Doubles